Bacchus is a non-carbonated South Korean energy drink, first launched in 1963. It is known by the brand names Bacchus-D and Bacchus-F, while the amount of Taurine in the latter product (2000mg) is higher. Both formulas are manufactured by Dong-A Pharmaceutical Co., Ltd., part of the Dong-A Socio Group; and is also distributed in the United States under the Dong-A America Corporation in a 3.3 oz glass bottle (approximately 1/3 the size of a Red Bull).

History 
Bacchus was invented by Kang Shinho with a strong influence from Lipovitan-D, who was a student of medicine in Germany in the 1950s. He named the product Bacchus after he saw the statue for the Greek god Bacchus inside of the Hamburg City Hall. Bacchus started in 1961 as tablet (박카스-정) before Kang turned it into a drink in 1963.

Bacchus has been popular in South Korea for many years. Originally, it was sold in pharmacies as an 'herbal medicine' to prevent colds and cure hangovers, rather than as an energy drink. The Bacchus-D and -F formulas are both manufactured and sold in South Korea at this time; neither line has been discontinued. The use of Bacchus-F among university students is highly prevalent.  

It has recently risen to prominence in American culture alongside other popular energy drinks consumed in combination with alcohol, such as Vodka-Red Bull. The most common form of consumption is the "Bacchus Bomb", which is produced by pouring a full 3.3 oz bottle of Bacchus into a cup and subsequently dropping a shot glass filled with vodka into the cup, with the resulting mixture being consumed as rapidly as possible.

In popular culture
The Bacchus Lady is a South Korean film that was presented in the Panorama section of the 66th Berlin International Film Festival. The film depicts the life of an elderly Bacchus Lady, which is a Korean prostitute selling the Bacchus energy drink.

In the 2009 Korean film Mother, directed by Bong Joon-ho, the protagonist is given a bottle of insecticide by his mother in a Bacchus bottle as a child.

Ingredients 
Bacchus contains the following ingredients:

Water
High fructose corn syrup
Sugar
Taurine
Inositol
Guarana extract
Royal jelly
Nicotinamide
Pyridoxine HCl
Riboflavin sodium phosphate
Thiamine
Nitrate preserved with sodium benzoate
Ethanol
Citric acid anhydrous
Sorbitol
Apple juice
Sodium chloride
Natural essences (orange pineapple, strawberry)
Artificial flavor

References

External links 
 Official site

Energy drinks
Products introduced in 1963
South Korean brands